Ellen Reed may refer to:
 Ellen Elizabeth Reed, code-breaker at Bletchley Park
 Ellen Reed, a character on the TV series Family Ties